The Limestone Saints are the athletic teams that represent Limestone University, located in Gaffney, South Carolina, in NCAA Division II intercollegiate sporting competitions. The Saints compete as members of the South Atlantic Conference (SAC) for most sports, having joined that league in July 2020 after 22 years in Conference Carolinas (CC). Limestone maintains CC membership in two sports, specifically men's wrestling and women's acrobatics & tumbling. Men's wrestling is one of two sports in which the SAC and CC operate as a single league, the other being women's field hockey. The SAC operates the field hockey championship, while CC operates the wrestling championship. The men's volleyball team competes as an independent. The swim team competed in the Bluegrass Mountain Conference before being dropped in 2018; the field hockey and wrestling teams were members of the ECAC–Division II before 2018, when the SAC and CC established their alliance in those two sports. The football team had been independent, but entered into a scheduling agreement with the SAC in 2015. This agreement was replaced in 2017 by formal affiliate membership, which continued until the Saints joined the SAC full-time in 2020.

History
Until 1997, Limestone competed for championships in the National Association of Intercollegiate Athletics (NAIA). Limestone gained membership in the National Collegiate Athletic Association's (NCAA) Division II in 1991 and began competing for NCAA championships when it joined the Carolinas-Virginia Athletics Conference in 1998. Today, 21 of Limestone's athletic teams compete in the South Atlantic Conference, with women's acrobatics & tumbling and men's wrestling competing in Conference Carolinas, and men's volleyball and women's wrestling competing as independents. In 2014, the field hockey team joined the inaugural ECAC Division II conference in that sport and was joined by wrestling (previously competing as an independent) for the 2015–16 season, with both sports moving to the SAC–CC alliance when it was established in 2018.

The most recently added sports are acrobatics & tumbling and women's wrestling, both added in the 2019–20 school year. Both sports became part of the NCAA Emerging Sports for Women program in 2020–21, at which time CC became the second NCAA conference to officially sponsor acrobatics & tumbling (after the D-II Mountain East Conference).

Limestone helped pave the way for collegiate lacrosse, swimming, and field hockey in the South. The Saints fielded South Carolina's first collegiate lacrosse team in 1990. Before being dropped after the 2017–18 season, the swimming teams were the only NCAA Division II swimming programs in South Carolina and among the few in the two Carolinas.

Over the years, the Saints baseball, men's and women's basketball, men's and women's golf, men's and women's lacrosse, softball, men's soccer, men's wrestling, and men's and women's tennis teams have all been ranked on the national level. Twelve student-athletes have gone on to play professionally in their sport, with seven of those signing professional baseball contracts. The Saints baseball program was started by two-time Cy Young Award winner Gaylord Perry, a member of the Major League Baseball Hall of Fame. Additionally, Saints athletes have earned All-American honors on over 100 occasions and over a dozen have been named Academic All-Americans.

Varsity teams

List of teams

Men's sports (12)
 Baseball
 Basketball
 Cross country
 Football
 Golf
 Lacrosse
 Soccer
 Tennis
 Track and field
 Volleyball
 Wrestling

Women's sports (13)
 Acrobatics & tumbling
 Basketball
 Cross country
 Field hockey
 Golf
 Lacrosse
 Soccer
 Softball
 Tennis
 Track and field
 Volleyball
 Wrestling

National championships

Team

Individual

Conference championships

Regular-season conference championships 
(since 1998)
 Baseball (2005)
 Women's Basketball (2012-2017)
 Women's Lacrosse (2004–2016)
 Women's Soccer (2017)
 Men's Lacrosse (1998–2017)
 Men's Soccer (2012, 2014)
 Softball (2009–2011, 2014–2016)
 Volleyball (2006)
 Field Hockey (2014–2015)

Conference tournament titles 
 Men's lacrosse (1994, 2000–2007, 2009–17)
 Women's lacrosse (2006, 2008–14, 2016–2017)
 Men's soccer (2006, 2012)
 Women's soccer (2015, 2017)
 Softball (2015)
 Field Hockey (2014–2015)
 Women's track and field (2009 and 2010)
 Men's track and field (2013)
 Men's basketball (2011, 2014, 2017)
 Women's basketball (2012, 2014–2016)
 Men's golf (2015–2017)
 Women's golf (2014–2016)

Individual sports

Men's lacrosse 
Limestone is an established powerhouse in men's lacrosse and has won five national championship titles (2000, 2002, 2014, 2015, and 2017). The Saints have also compiled nineteen Conference Championship titles in (1994, 1999–2007, and 2009–2017). With its 2000 national title, Limestone College became the smallest coeducational institution to ever win an NCAA national championship. They are set to play on Sunday, May 26, 2019.

Women's lacrosse 
The Limestone College women's lacrosse program has made appearances in nine NCAA Division II National Tournaments (2004, 2006 and 2008–2014), reaching the NCAA DII National Championship in both 2011 and 2013. They have been regular-season conference champions for thirteen consecutive seasons (2004–2016) and accumulated nine conference tournament championships (2006, 2008–2014, 2016). They are the southernmost collegiate women's lacrosse program to make an appearance in a national tournament. The current Head Coach of the program is Scott Tucker (2002–present).  Tucker beginning in 2015 became the winningest active coach in NCAA Division II women's lacrosse.

Women's basketball 
Limestone's women's basketball program has made 5 consecutive appearances in the NCAA Division II National Tournament (2012-2016), reaching the elite eight in 2014, and the final four in 2015.

Football
On October 26, 2012, Limestone announced they would add football and begin play in 2014. Bobby James, previously the defensive coordinator at Wingate University was named the inaugural head coach on December 14, 2012. After a "redshirt" season with players but only scrimmages, Limestone began NCAA Division II play in the fall of 2014 and recorded a record of 2–9, followed by a 2–8 season in 2015. James left the program in early 2016, and on May 11, 2016, Limestone College announced the hiring of former National Football League wide receiver Mike Furrey as the second head coach for the Saints. Furrey was previously wide receivers coach at Marshall University and a former head coach at Kentucky Christian University. Under Furrey, the Saints went 5–6 in his first season, followed by a 4–6 campaign in 2017. He departed the team in January 2018 to become the wide receivers coach for the Chicago Bears.

The Saints had competed in football as an independent, but during the 2015–2018 seasons arranged a scheduling agreement with the South Atlantic Conference to provide most of their contests.  In April 2017 the Limestone Saints were announced as the first associate member of the South Atlantic Conference (in any sport), and began competition in the SAC beginning in fall 2017. They remained an SAC football affiliate until becoming a full conference member in 2020.

References

External links